Neelu Mishra (/nee-loo mish-ra/ alias Neelu Anand Dubey, born 1 July 1972) is an Indian Sprinter from Varanasi, India. She has represented India in Master Athletics, meant for athletes over 35 years at various competitions in various track and field events such as the 100 meters, 200 meters, 80 meters hurdle, Long Jump, and High Jump. A child prodigy in sports, Mishra grew up in Basti, Uttar Pradesh and participated in more than 10 national tournaments through the late 1980s and the early 1990s and bagged countless medals. She was the fourth fastest girl in India in 1994, and her state level inter-university record of clocking 100 meters in 12.00 seconds in 1993 remains unbeaten till date.

After getting married in 1995, she had to stop participating in sports due to societal pressure and family commitments. A few years into her married life, she was diagnosed with acute renal infection, several heart complications, obesity, asthma, chronic diabetes, and hypertension. In 2002, experts feared that her life was in grave danger as prolonged intake of antibiotics turned her into a veritable vegetable.

Professional Career     

International Events At International level, she brought accolades to India by winning several international medals. She participated in the World Masters Athletics Championship, Finland in 2009 and won a bronze medal.

Asia Masters Athletics Championships held at Kuala Lumpur in 2010.

National Events

Neelu participated and proved her accolade at multiple national events before getting married. However, coming back in her ‘second innings’, over the period of 12 years, she has won a total of 8 golds, 21 silvers and 7 bronze medals in 5 All India Civil Services Athletics Competitions[1] and 10 National Master's Athletics Competitions.

Since 2009, she has also been bearing the flag of the team captain of the contingent of athletes representing the Indian state of Uttar Pradesh at the national level competitions.

References 

Year of birth missing (living people)
Living people
Indian female sprinters
Indian masters athletes